The LUTZ Pathfinder is a prototype autonomous microcar. The two-seater prototype pod has been built by Coventry-based RDM Group, and was first shown to the public in February 2015.

The LUTZ (Low-carbon Urban Transport Zone) Pathfinder pod is part of the UK Government's Transport Systems Catapult Autodrive project, a £20 million project.

Three pods were tested initially in Milton Keynes during 2015 to ensure that they can comply with the Highway Code.

Specification
The pod is a two-seater electric car with space for luggage. The self-driving equipment includes 19 sensors, cameras, radar and Lidar. Users can hail them by using a smartphone app.

The autonomous control software is developed by Mobile Robotics Group from University of Oxford.

Partners
The Lutz Pathfinder pod has been developed by the UK Automotive Council, Department for Business, Innovation and Skills and RDM Group.

Public trials
The first trial of autonomous operation on a public road, with pedestrians, cycles and other vehicles, was conducted in Milton Keynes on 11 October 2016. The vehicles "operated as expected."

References

External links

RDM Group product page 

Experimental self-driving cars
Electric vehicles